Camille O'Grady (December 31, 1949 – March 17, 2020) was an American musician, visual artist, poet, drag king, and performance artist. She described herself as a "multimedium" artist.

Early life 
Camille O'Grady grew up in New Jersey and was raised Catholic. She was the eldest of seven siblings. After high school she moved to New York City and studied fine art at the Pratt Institute. At Pratt she met photographer Robert Mapplethorpe.

Career 
In 1974 she started the band "Leather Secrets" which then became "Secrets" and then "Camille O'Grady Band". She and her band were involved with the New York punk scene, playing many venues associated with the punk movement such as CBGB and Max's Kansas City. "Leather Secrets" played with Television and both bands were mentioned by David Bowie who said “Yes, I've seen a lot of good new bands this time. A lot of bands with good names, anyway, how d`ya like `Leather Secrets` and `Television`?” In 1978 Lou Reed invited her to open for him on his "Street Hassle Tour". Reed described her as "Patti Smith without a social conscience." She was in the movie New York City Inferno.

O'Grady performed at gay bars and leather clubs, and was one of the few women allowed in the Mineshaft. She performed as a drag king named "Jake Savage". In 1979 she moved to San Francisco and began to date Robert Opel. On July 7, 1979, Robert Opel was killed by two men. Camille O'Grady was present for the murder and testified against the murderers. She was in the 2010 documentary "Uncle Bob" which was about Robert Opel.

Death 
On March 17, 2020, Camille O'Grady died from liver cancer.

References 

Women in punk
American drag kings
1949 births
2020 deaths
Pratt Institute alumni
Deaths from liver cancer